Harry T Dunn (23 December 1906 – 16 March 1978) was a British boxer. He competed in the men's welterweight event at the 1928 Summer Olympics.

Dunn won the 1927 Amateur Boxing Association British welterweight title, when boxing out of the Lynn ABC.

References

External links
 

1906 births
1978 deaths
British male boxers
Olympic boxers of Great Britain
Boxers at the 1928 Summer Olympics
Place of birth missing
Welterweight boxers